Lauzon is a former city in southern Quebec, Canada, located on the St. Lawrence River northeast of Lévis. Founded in 1867 as a village it became a town in 1910, Lauzon had a population of about 14,500 when it merged with Lévis in 1989. The then-amalgamated city had the name of Lévis-Lauzon for about one year in 1991, before merging again and changing its name for good to Lévis.

History

In 1867, Lauzon was named for Jean de Lauzon, Governor of New France from 1651 to 1656. The area was once part of the Seignory of Lauzon creating in 1636 and later named 'St-Joseph-de-la-Pointe-Lévy.

Economy
One of Lauzon's former largest employers was a shipyard operated by Davie Shipbuilding.  Davie's Champlain dry dock is currently the largest in Canada. The Davie Shipyard is now home to Chantier Davie Canada Incorporated.

Other employers include:

 Cimetière Mont-Marie - opened in 1888
 FritoLay Canada
 Galeries du Vieux-Fort - shopping mall with 40 stores
 Multi-Marques Master Bakers (Canada Bread)

Transportation

 rue Saint Joseph - road travels along and near the south shore of the St. Lawrence River
 rue Monseigneur-Bourget - connects rue Saint Joseph with Autoroute Jean-Lesage and named for Ignace Bourget, former Bishop of Montreal and was born in nearby St. Joseph Parish

Climate

References

Neighbourhoods in Lévis, Quebec
Populated places disestablished in 1989
Former municipalities in Quebec
1867 establishments in Quebec